Brunello Cucinelli S.p.A. is an Italian luxury fashion brand which sells menswear, women's wear and accessories in Europe, North America and East Asia.

History
Brunello Cucinelli started his couture house in 1978 with a specialty for Mongolian cashmere garments for women.

In June 2014, owner Brunello Cucinelli, transferred the ownership of Fedone Srl (which owned 61.56% of the fashion brand) to a new trust, Esperia Trust Company S.r.l., in a move to benefit his daughters and pursue his philanthropic work.

In 2017, Brunello Cucinelli recorded 500 million euro in sales,  35% of which in North America. The company owns 94 of its 124 branded stores worldwide. In January 2017, the company launched an ecommerce website. In January 2018, the founder, Brunello Cucinelli, sold 4 million shares of his company (owned through his holding Fedone Srl), and brought his participation down to 51% of the company's capital. Through this move, 6% of the company (worth 100 million euros) was invested in his family's charitable fund. In May 2018, the company opened its second store in Mexico. Both Mexican stores are located in the country's capital.

Organization
Cucinelli's family trust owns 57% of the company's stock, which went public in 2012 at €7.75 per share. The  company is headquartered in a 14th-century castle on the top of a hill in the middle of Umbria, an area known as the "green heart" of Italy.

The company donates 20% of profits to its charitable foundation, and pays workers wages that are 20% higher than the industry average. The company's 1,300 employees (of whom 800 work in Solomeo) do not punch a time clock; after-hours e-mails are not allowed. As of June 2017, the company has a market capitalization of over €1.6 billion.

See also
Made in Italy
Loro Piana
Kiton
Billy Reid

References

External links
 Official site
 "Brunello Cucinelli Clothes Can Make You a Better Man. Provided You’re Very, Very Rich."   JON CARAMANICA, The New York Times, April 1, 2015

Luxury brands
Italian suit makers
Shoe companies of Italy
Companies based in Umbria
High fashion brands
Italian brands
Clothing companies established in 1978
Italian companies established in 1978
Companies listed on the Borsa Italiana
Altagamma members